Ann Barbara Govednik (July 21, 1916 – August 6, 1985), also known by her married name Ann Van Steinburg, was an American competition swimmer who represented the United States at the 1932 and 1936 Summer Olympics. As a 16-year-old at the 1932 Olympics in Los Angeles, she finished sixth in the finals of the women's 200-meter breaststroke. Four years later, in Berlin, Germany, Govednik was eliminated in the first round of the 200-meter breaststroke.

External links
 

1916 births
1985 deaths
American female breaststroke swimmers
Olympic swimmers of the United States
People from Chisholm, Minnesota
Swimmers at the 1932 Summer Olympics
Swimmers at the 1936 Summer Olympics
20th-century American women